Danganronpa: The Animation is a 2013 anime television series based on Spike Chunsoft's murder mystery video game, Danganronpa: Trigger Happy Havoc. The series follows a boy named Makoto Naegi who, along with fourteen other students, is imprisoned inside the elite Hope's Peak Academy, where a psychotic remote-controlled bear named Monokuma offers them only one means of escape: murder another student and get away with it.

The anime is produced by Lerche and directed by Seiji Kishi, who is known for directing the anime adaptations Persona 4: The Animation and Devil Survivor 2: The Animation. The series uses Makoto Uezu for its series composition as well as script writing, character designs by Kazuaki Morita based on the original character designs by Rui Komatsuzaki, art direction by Kazuto Shimoyama and sound direction by Satoki Iida. The 13-episode series aired in Japan between July 4 and September 26, 2013, on MBS' Animeism programming block, also airing on TBS, CBC and BS-TBS. The series has been licensed in North America by Funimation, who simulcast the series online and released it on DVD and Blu-ray Disc on November 10, 2015. Manga Entertainment released the series in the United Kingdom on November 9, 2015. Madman Entertainment licensed the series in Australia and New Zealand, Melanesia and Polynesia Region (Cook Islands, Fiji, Tokelau, Solomon Islands, Samoa, Papua New Guinea, and Tonga) who simulcasted the series on Madman Screening Room and released the series on February 10, 2016.


Episode list

Reception
Gaming website GamingTrend gave the series a 40 out of 100 overall, criticizing it for its length and portrayal of events from Trigger Happy Havoc, stating that "no character, moment, or message gets the time it deserves."

References

External links
 Official Anime Website

Danganronpa
Danganronpa: The Animation